Semi-Gloss was an alternative pop/rock band from the East Village in New York City.

Band history
The band formed in the early 1990s between Jordy Mokriski and Verena Wiesendanger after Mokriski spent a year in Los Angeles writing songs. When he returned to New York City, he and Wiesendanger recorded a four-track demo. The band gained a small following, performing regularly on the Lower East Side at Luna Lounge, and began opening for artists such as Cat Power and Blonde Redhead. They appeared on KCRW's Morning Becomes Eclectic in 1999. They contributed their single "The Sunburn Song" to the Nickelodeon television series The Adventures of Pete & Pete.

Throughout the career of the band, it had been difficult to secure a drummer. Three years after the release of their debut album, the band awaited the release of their second studio album, The Falling Kind on Dirt Records. When the album was delayed, the band members decided to put the band on hiatus.

Though The Falling Kind was eventually released on Dirt Records, the label has since shut down. Copies of albums by the band have since become difficult to find.

Band members
Jordy Mokriski - guitar, vocals
Verena Wiesendanger - vocals, keyboards, percussion
Gregory Graf - bass
Henry Baum - drums
Jason Harmon - drums
Dave Berger - drums

Discography
Teenie (1996)
Semi-Gloss (1997)
The Falling Kind (2000)

External links

Indie rock musical groups from New York (state)
Musical groups from New York City